The 2022 Speedway of Nations was the fifth FIM Speedway of Nations. The competition consisted of two semi-finals and a final. Great Britain were the defending champions having won the 2021 competition.

Both the semi-finals and final were held at Vojens Speedway Center in Denmark, after the initial host Esbjerg was unable to fulfill the contract. Denmark were automatically seeded into the final as hosts.

The first semi-final was won by Australia, with Finland securing the second automatic qualifying spot. Poland won a run-off with Germany to secure the last spot. The second semi-final was won by Sweden, ahead of Czech Republic. Great Britain beat France in a run-off to complete the final line-up.

Australia won the competition after beating Great Britain in the final. Great Britain had top scored during the regular heats, but Jack Holder and Max Fricke beat Dan Bewley and Robert Lambert in the Grand Final to take the title for the first time. Sweden claimed the bronze medal.

First semi-final
  Vojens Speedway Center, Vojens, Denmark
 27 July

Final Qualifier

Second semi-final
  Vojens Speedway Center, Vojens, Denmark
 28 July

Slovakia replaced by Norway after Slovakia withdrew following an injury to their leading rider Martin Vaculík.

Final Qualifier

Final
  Vojens Speedway Center, Vojens, Denmark
 30 July

Grand Final Qualifier

Grand Final

References

2022
Speedway of Nations
Speedway of Nations
Speedway of Nations
International sports competitions hosted by Denmark